is a Japanese amateur astronomer and discoverer of minor planets and comets, born in Kōchi, Japan.

Career 

Tsutomu Seki is the Director of the Geisei Observatory in Kōchi, and in charge of the Comet Section of the Oriental Astronomical Association. Between 1961 and 1970, he had visually discovered six comets, including C/1965 S1 (Ikeya-Seki), the well known great comet of 1965.

Many of his discoveries are named after famous sites in Kōchi, such as Harimaya-bashi, Ryōma (after Sakamoto Ryōma), Katsurahama beach, and Kagami-gawa.

Awards and honors 

Asteroid 3426 Seki, discovered by Karl Reinmuth at the Heidelberg Observatory in 1932, was named in his honor. The official naming citation was published by the Minor Planet Center on 16 December 1986.

List of discovered minor planets

See also

References

External links 
 Tsutomu Seki homepage
 A list of minor planets discovered by Tsutomu Seki, recognized as of August 2011

Discoverers of comets
1930 births
Living people
20th-century Japanese astronomers
Discoverers of asteroids
People from Kōchi, Kōchi